The 2020 Israeli Basketball League Cup, for sponsorships reasons the Winner League Cup, is the 15th edition of the pre-season tournament of the Israeli Basketball Premier League. All twelve Israeli Premier League  team's was participate except from Hapoel Tel Aviv because the participation at the Champions League

Bracket

First round

Maccabi Haifa vs. Ironi Nahariya

Ironi Nes Ziona vs. Hapoel Eilat

Hapoel Haifa vs. Hapoel Be'er Sheva

Hapoel Gilboa Galil vs. Bnei Herzliya

Quarterfinals

Maccabi Rishon LeZion vs. Maccabi Haifa

Hapoel Jerusalem vs. Hapoel Eilat

Hapoel Holon vs. Hapoel Gilboa Galil

Maccabi Tel Aviv vs. Hapoel Haifa

Semifinals

Maccabi Rishon LeZion vs. Maccabi Tel Aviv

Hapoel Jerusalem vs. Hapoel Holon

Final

Maccabi Tel Aviv vs. Hapoel Holon

References

2020
League Cup